David 'Duck' Dowle (born 20 October 1953 in London, England) is an English drummer who has played with the bands Brian Auger's Oblivion Express, Streetwalkers, Whitesnake, Runner, Midnight Flyer, Bernie Marsden.

Biography
Dave Dowle started his career when he was 13: he joined his first band, Canterbury Glass, playing alongside future Genesis guitarist Steve Hackett. According to Dowle, the band recorded a Radio One session after meeting the late John Peel DJing at a gig. Following Canterbury Glass, he worked with a variety of artists including Doris Troy and PP Arnold before forming a band called Curly who also recorded a John Peel session in November 1973. Steve Farr and Stewart Blandameer from Curly both ended up in the Q-Tips with Paul Young, with Blandameer also working with Status Quo. Dowle next worked with Brian Auger's Oblivion Express, touring the US and appearing on the Reinforcements album in 1975.

In September 1976, Dowle joined the Streetwalkers replacing Nicko McBrain, and this line-up of Dowle, Brian Johnston, Roger Chapman, Charlie Whitney, Bobby Tench and Micky Feat released a studio album, 'Vicious But Fair' in January 1977. By the end of '77, however, the band had run out of steam, and a live album, released in December 1977, proved to be their final release.

In January 1978, Dowle joined ex-Deep Purple singer David Coverdale in his new band Whitesnake. Joining David Dowle in the band was another ex-member of the Streetwalkers, keyboard player, Brian Johnston, although he would be replaced within a couple of months by Pete Solley. The rest of the band was Coverdale on vocals, Micky Moody and Bernie Marsden on guitars and Neil Murray on bass. This line-up recorded the 'Snakebite' EP, which was released in June 1978. By June 1978, another change of keyboard player was announced with Coverdale's old Purple buddy Jon Lord adding his considerable experience to the band. This line-up undertook a major UK tour in October and November 1978 and released an album Trouble in October of that year. Whitesnake then undertook a world tour, which served notice of a major new band on the scene. Another album, Lovehunter, was recorded, but in August 1979, even before the album was released, Dowle was replaced by Ian Paice, yet another ex-member of Deep Purple. Dowle's final appearance on a Whitesnake recording was on two sides of Live... in the Heart of the City released in November 1980.

After departure from Whitesnake, Dowle  continued to play on sessions. "I was really a session player. With any band I was working with I'd always carry on doing sessions."

Discography

With Brian Auger's Oblivion Express
Reinforcements

With Whitesnake
Snakebite (1978)
Trouble (1978)
Lovehunter (1979)
Live At Hammersmith (1979)

With Runner
Runner (1978)

With Midnight Flyer
 Midnight Flyer
 Rock 'n' Roll Party

With Mark Zed
 My Calculator's Right (1980)

References

External links
 

1953 births
Living people
British male drummers
English rock drummers
Whitesnake members
Musicians from London
Streetwalkers members